is a Japanese actress known for her role as Rei in Mutant Girls Squad and also Rinko Daimon in the 2012 Kamen Rider series Kamen Rider Wizard. She is affiliated with Stardust Promotion.

Filmography

TV series

Films

References

External links
Official profile at Stardust Promotion 

 高山侑子(takayamayuko_stardust) - Instagram 

21st-century Japanese actresses
1992 births
Living people
People from Niigata Prefecture
Stardust Promotion artists